The Tournament is a 2013 book by Australian author Matthew Reilly.

Summary
Set in 1546 in the Ottoman Empire with Queen Elizabeth as the main character with her mentor Roger Ascham who travel to the Ottoman Empire accepting the challenge of a chess tournament with Gilbert Giles representing England. There is also a murderer on the loose and the case is given to Roger Ascham. Will Roger Ascham manage to find the murderer and what does happen to the infamous and sexually volatile mistress of Elizabeth?

Novels by Matthew Reilly
Novels set in the Ottoman Empire
Novels set in the 1540s
2013 Australian novels
Pan Books books